Maple Lake is a lake in Wright County, in the U.S. state of Minnesota.

Maple Lake was named for groves of sugar maple trees near its shores.

Maple Lake is located in Maple Lake township

See also
List of lakes in Minnesota

References

Lakes of Minnesota
Lakes of Wright County, Minnesota